Lubná is a municipality and village in Svitavy District in the Pardubice Region of the Czech Republic. It has about 900 inhabitants.

Notable people
Lubor Bárta (1928–1972), composer

References

Villages in Svitavy District